This article displays the squads for the 1984 UEFA European Under-21 Championship. Although teams could have a maximum of three older players, the remaining squad members had to have been born on or after 1 January 1960. Players in bold have later been capped at full international level.

Albania
Managers:  Shyqyri Rreli and  Ramazan Rragami

The following players participated in the 1984 UEFA European Under-21 Championship two-legged match against Italy U21 on 14 March & 4 April 1984.

England
Manager:  Dave Sexton

The following players participated in the 1984 UEFA European Under-21 Championship.

References

UEFA European Under-21 Championship squads
1984 UEFA European Under-21 Championship